The 2020 Mongolian National Premier League was the 52nd season of the Mongolian National Premier League. The season began on 1 July and ended in September 2020. This is the final year of a three-year sponsorship deal with Mazala.

Teams

League table

Positions by round
This table lists the positions of teams after each week of matches. In order to preserve the chronological evolution, any postponed matches are not included to the round at which they were originally scheduled, but added to the full round they were played immediately afterwards. For example, if a match is scheduled for matchday 13, but then postponed and played between days 16 and 17, it will be added to the standings for day 16.

Results

Season's progress

Top goalscorers

References

External links
 Mongolian Premier League summary (SOCCERWAY)

Mongolia Premier League seasons
Mongolia
1